The Institute of Red Professors of the All-Union Communist Party (Bolsheviks) was an institute of graduate-level education in the Marxist social sciences located in the Orthodox Convent of the Passion, Moscow.

History
It was founded in February 1921 to address a shortage of Marxist professors but only about 25 percent of its graduates continued an academic career; most rather became functionaries  of the Communist Party. At first it was under the jurisdiction of the Central Executive Committee of the Soviet Union and later under the Department for Agitation and Propaganda (Agitprop). The studies lasted four years and students (nicknamed ikapisty) were required to write research papers, which were often published and represented a significant body of Marxist historical research. Two hundred thirty-six students completed the course between 1924 and 1929. In 1929, there were 69 teachers at the institute, seven of whom were not members of the Communist Party. Its rectors were Mikhail Pokrovsky (1921–31) and Pavel Yudin (1932–38). The institute was abolished in 1938. The institute was integrated into a system of higher party schools of the Central Committee of the Communist Party of the Soviet Union.

References

Universities and institutes established in the Soviet Union
Educational institutions established in 1921
1938 disestablishments in the Soviet Union
1921 establishments in Russia
Educational institutions disestablished in 1938
Institute of Red Professors